Serres Province was one of the four provinces of Serres Prefecture of Greece. Its territory corresponded with that of the current municipalities Emmanouel Pappas and Serres, and part of the municipality Irakleia. It was abolished in 2006.

References

Provinces of Greece